Mehmet Atıf Ateşdağlı (1876; Crete - December 3, 1947; Istanbul) was an officer of the Ottoman Army and of the Turkish Army.

Medals and decorations
Order of the Medjidie 4th class
Silver Medal of Liyakat 
Gallipoli Star (Ottoman Empire)
Medal of Independence with Red Ribbon and Citation

See also
List of high-ranking commanders of the Turkish War of Independence

Sources

External links

1876 births
1947 deaths
Cretan Turks
Ottoman Military Academy alumni
Ottoman Army officers
Ottoman military personnel of the Balkan Wars
Ottoman military personnel of World War I
Turkish Army officers
Turkish military personnel of the Greco-Turkish War (1919–1922)
Recipients of the Order of the Medjidie, 4th class
Recipients of the Liakat Medal
Recipients of the Medal of Independence with Red Ribbon (Turkey)
People from Crete